Boneh-ye Musa (also Romanized as Boneh-ye Mūsá) is a village in Lalar and Katak Rural District, Chelo District, Andika County, Khuzestan Province, Iran. At the 2006 census, its population was 131, in 23 families.

References 

Populated places in Andika County